Martin Jay Davis (September 7, 1937 – January 10, 2022) was an American astrologer and author specializing in locational astrology, as well as a member of the United States fencing team (foil), who competed at the 1972 Olympic Games in Munich. During the 1963 Pan American Games he won a gold medal with the US fencing team (foil). His first title, Astrolocality Astrology, won the Spica award for the best astrology book in 2000.

Davis died in Zeeland in the Netherlands, on January 10, 2022, at the age of 84.

Publications
Astrolocality Astrology (2000) Wessex Astrologer, Dorset, UK. 
From Here to There: An Astrologer's Guide to Astromapping (2007) Wessex Astrologer, Dorset, UK.

References

1937 births
2022 deaths
American astrologers
20th-century astrologers
21st-century astrologers
American male foil fencers
Fencers at the 1972 Summer Olympics
Olympic fencers of the United States
Sportspeople from St. Louis
Pan American Games medalists in fencing
Pan American Games gold medalists for the United States
Fencers at the 1963 Pan American Games